The Admiral Petre Bărbuneanu-class corvette (also known as the Tetal-I class by NATO) is a series of four corvettes designed and constructed for the Romanian Naval Forces primarily for anti-submarine warfare. Only two corvettes out of a total of the four are still in service. Designed and constructed in the 1980s, they are a product of the Cold War with their armament and sensors based on Soviet designs. This class of corvettes was superseded by the Rear-Admiral Eustațiu Sebastian (Tetal-II) class.

Design and description
The Admiral Petre Bărbuneanu class was based on the Soviet Navy's  but designed in Romania to a smaller size, though retaining their anti-submarine warfare (ASW) role. They incorporated Soviet weapons and sensors into their design. The ships are powered by four diesel engines driving four shafts creating .

The vessels are armed with four Soviet-designed AK-276 /59 calibre guns in two twin turrets with one turret situated forward and aft. For anti-aircraft (AA) defence, the corvettes have four AK-230 /65 calibre AA guns in two twin mounts positioned aft, forward of the aft 76 mm turret. They also mount two single-mounted  machine guns along the amidships. The ships have four  torpedo tubes in two twin mounts situated aft to either side of the aft 76 mm gun turret.

Admiral Petre Bărbuneanu-class corvettes are equipped with Soviet MR-302 (NATO reporting name: Strut Curve) air search/surface search radar, MR-104 Rys (NATO reporting name: Drum Tilt) and MR-105 Turel (NATO reporting name: Hawk Screech) fire control radar. They have Hercules MG-22 hull-mounted sonar for underwater search and two PK 16 chaff launchers and RW-23 (NATO reporting name: Watch Dog) electronic support measures. The corvettes have a complement of 98.

Ships in class

Construction and career
The vessels were constructed at the Mangalia Shipyard for the Romanian Naval Forces. The first ship to commission was Amiral Petre Bărbuneanu in 1983. Three more corvettes would follow before the project was terminated in 1987 in favour of a new design that incorporated a helicopter flight deck. In 2004, two of the corvettes, Vice-Amiral Vasile Urseanu and Vice-Amiral Vasile Scodrea were decommissioned. The remaining ships are based at Constanța.

Notes

Citations

References

External links
 World Navies Today

Corvettes of the Romanian Naval Forces
Corvette classes